Corthylus is a genus of typical bark beetles in the family Curculionidae. There are more than 190 described species in Corthylus.

See also
 List of Corthylus species

References

Further reading

 
 
 

Scolytinae
Articles created by Qbugbot